Ford Rainey (August 8, 1908 – July 25, 2005) was an American film, stage, and television actor.

Early life
Rainey was born in Mountain Home, Idaho, the son of Vyrna (née Kinkade), a teacher, and Archie Coleman Rainey. He first acted on the stage while a student at Centralia High School, where he graduated in 1927. Rainey graduated from Centralia Junior College in Washington state and in 1933 from the Cornish School, now Cornish College of the Arts, in Seattle.

He then moved to Connecticut to study acting at the Michael Chekhov Theatre Studio. Growing up in the outdoors and learning to ride horses helped him in his career as a tough-guy film presence later in life. Like many young actors, he worked odd jobs, including as a logger, fisherman, fruit picker, carpenter, and clam digger, in addition to working on an oil tanker before becoming a successful actor.

He served in the U.S. Coast Guard during World War II.

Career
Rainey worked at radio stations KJR and KOMO in Seattle, Washington, as well as being a touring stage actor before breaking into films. His Broadway debut was in a 1939 Chekhov production of The Possessed with fellow Cornish alumnus Beatrice Straight that had a run of 14 performances. After the war he moved to Ojai, California, where he, Woodrow Chambliss and other actors who had studied under Chekhov founded the Ojai Valley Players.

He made his film debut in White Heat starring James Cagney in 1949 and became a familiar face in motion pictures, appearing in Perfect Strangers (1950) with Ginger Rogers, Two Rode Together (1961) with James Stewart and Richard Widmark, 40 Pounds of Trouble (1962) with Tony Curtis, Johnny Tiger (1966) with Robert Taylor, and The Sand Pebbles (1966) with Steve McQueen. His other film credits included The Gypsy Moths (1969) with Burt Lancaster and Deborah Kerr, The Naked Zoo (1970) with Rita Hayworth, The Traveling Executioner (1970), My Old Man's Place (1971), Sixteen (1973), the horror films Halloween II (1981) and The Cellar (1989), Bed & Breakfast (1992) with Roger Moore and Inferno (1999). He also co-starred in the acclaimed television movie My Sweet Charlie (1970), and appeared in other TV movies such as A Howling in the Woods (1971) and The Stranger Who Looks Like Me (1974) with Meredith Baxter and Beau Bridges.

He guest-starred on such television series as The Adventures of Kit Carson, Bonanza, The Invaders, The Brothers Brannagan (in the 1961 series finale "The Hunter and the Hunted"), The Tall Man with Clu Gulager, Stoney Burke, Daniel Boone with Fess Parker, Gunsmoke, The Wild Wild West, Empire, Dundee and the Culhane, Baa Baa Black Sheep, How the West was Won (aka The Macahans), The Untouchables with Robert Stack, and the 1976 western Sara. The tall austere, authoritative-looking actor was a natural at playing leaders.

In the 1961–62 season Rainey co-starred with Robert Young in the CBS series Window on Main Street, in which he portrayed newspaper editor Lloyd Ramsey. In 1963–1964, he was a member of the regular cast of the NBC anthology series The Richard Boone Show. He portrayed Dr. Barnett on the NBC crime drama Search in 1972–1973, he had the role of Police Chief Vernon in Tenafly in 1973–1974, and he played James Barrett on the crime drama The Manhunter on CBS in 1974–1975.

Between 1962 and 1965 Rainey made four guest appearances on the CBS courtroom series Perry Mason, beginning with the role of Russell Durham in "The Case of the Unsuitable Uncle." In 1964 he played murder victim Harry Trilling in "The Case of the Ugly Duckling."

During the mid-1960s, Ford played U.S. President Abraham Lincoln in The Time Tunnel episode “The Death Trap” with Robert Colbert, the uncredited President seen on the TV addressing the Robinsons before their launch in the pilot episode of Lost in Space “The Reluctant Stowaway”, as well as the President once more in the “Doomsday” episode of Voyage to the Bottom of the Sea. (He played Lincoln again a decade later in the 1976 theatrical film Guardian of the Wilderness.

Rainey portrayed the adoptive father of Lee Majors's Steve Austin (The Six Million Dollar Man), and the foster father of Jaime Sommers (The Bionic Woman). He appeared in the 1978 episode of Little House on the Prairie, I'll Be Waving as You Drive Away, and in the 1987 miniseries Amerika.

Rainey played a general on CBS's M*A*S*H, and a judge on both The Waltons and Matlock.  

Later television appearances, in the 1990s and 2000s, include ER and recurring roles on Wiseguy, Ned and Stacey, and The King of Queens. He could also be seen in some commercials in the middle 1970s through the 1980s, such as REACH toothbrushes. During that time he was part of Trinity Square Repertory Company in Providence, Rhode Island.

Personal life
Ford Rainey was a bachelor until the age of 46, when, in 1954, he married Sheila Hayden and settled in New York City, where sons Robert and James were born. The family moved to Malibu, California, where daughter Kathy was born.

Rainey remained in Malibu with his wife while he acted and enjoyed hobbies such as beekeeping and bird breeding until his death on July 25, 2005, of a stroke, at the age of 96. His interment was in Westwood Village Memorial Park Cemetery.

In May 2012, Ford's 54-year-old chiropractor son Robert Rainey was found murdered in his Los Angeles, California office.  The homicide remains unsolved.

Filmography

 White Heat (1949) – Zuckie Hommell (uncredited)
 Perfect Strangers (1950) – Ernest Craig (uncredited)
 The Robe (1953) – Ship's Captain (uncredited)
 The Human Jungle (1954) – Jones – Older Cop (uncredited)
 3:10 to Yuma (1957) – Bisbee Marshal
 The Badlanders (1958) – Warden
 The Last Mile (1959) – Red Kirby
 John Paul Jones (1959) – Lt. Simpson
 Flaming Star (1960) – Doc Phillips
 Parrish (1961) – John Donati (uncredited)
 Two Rode Together (1961) – Reverend Henry Clegg
 Ada (1961) – Speaker
 Claudelle Inglish (1961) – Rev. Armstrong
 Dead to the World (1961) – Congressman Keach
 40 Pounds of Trouble (1962) – Judge
 Kings of the Sun (1963) – The Chief
 Gunpoint (1966) – Tom Emerson
 Johnny Tiger (1966) – Sam Tiger
 The Sand Pebbles (1966) – Harris
 Chuka (1967) – Captain Robert R. Foster (uncredited)
 The Gypsy Moths (1969) – Stand Owner
 The Naked Zoo (1970) – Harry Golden
 The Traveling Executioner (1970) – Stanley Mae
 My Old Man's Place (1971) – Sheriff Coleman
 Sixteen (1973) – Pa Irtley
 Cotter (1973)
 The Parallax View (1974) – Commission Spokesman #2
 Guardian of the Wilderness (1976) – Abraham Lincoln
 The Mary Tyler Moore Show (1976) – Doctor
 Halloween ΙΙ (1981) – Dr. Frederick Mixter
 The Cellar (1989) – T.C. van Houten
 Bed & Breakfast (1992) – Amos
 The Politics of Desire (1998) – Radio Listener's Husband
 Inferno (1999) – Pop Reynolds
 The King of Queens (1999–2003) – Mickey
 Purgatory Flats (2003) – Phil

References

External links
 
 
 
 
 Michael Chekhov International Center

1908 births
2005 deaths
20th-century American male actors
American male film actors
American male television actors
Burials at Westwood Village Memorial Park Cemetery
Male actors from Idaho
Male actors from New York City
Male actors from Seattle
People from Greater Los Angeles
People from Mountain Home, Idaho
United States Coast Guard personnel of World War II